Arthur W. Evans (born 1868) was an English footballer who played in the Football League for Stoke.

Career
Evans was born in Stoke-upon-Trent and played for Stoke where he made nine appearances in the absence of first choice goalkeeper Bill Rowley. He was released once Tom Cain signed for Stoke. He later played for Barlaston Saints.

Career statistics

References

English footballers
Stoke City F.C. players
English Football League players
1868 births
Year of death missing
Association football goalkeepers